Carburazepam is a drug which is a benzodiazepine derivative.

References

Benzodiazepines
Chloroarenes
GABAA receptor positive allosteric modulators
Lactams
Ureas